Ilse Korseck (1911–1933) was a German stage and film actress. After working initially in theatre she began to appear in films from 1930 onwards during the early sound era. In 1933 she died suddenly at the age of twenty one.

Selected filmography
 How Do I Become Rich and Happy? (1930)
 The Trunks of Mr. O.F. (1931)
 The Night Without Pause (1931)
 A Blonde Dream (1932)
 When Love Sets the Fashion (1932)
 Scandal on Park Street (1932)
 The Importance of Being Earnest (1932)
 The Pride of Company Three (1932)
 Madame Makes Her Exit (1932)
 What Men Know (1933)

References

Bibliography 
 Christopher Young. The Films of Hedy Lamarr. Citadel Press, 1978.

External links 
 

Artists from Wrocław
1911 births
1933 deaths
German film actresses
German stage actresses